NOCO may refer to:
 The NOCO Company, a battery product manufacturer.
 NOCO Energy Corporation, an energy company.
 NoCo, an alternative rock band.
 Northern Colorado